Brookville Township is one of twenty-four townships in Ogle County, Illinois, USA.  As of the 2010 census, its population was 241 and it contained 117 housing units.

History
Brookville Township was one of the original twenty townships that were created when township government was adopted by the county; these townships were defined on February 5, 1850.

Geography
It contains the unincorporated town of Brookville and the cemeteries of Brookville Township and Chambers Grove.

Demographics

School districts
 Forrestville Valley Community Unit School District 221
 Polo Community Unit School District 222

Political districts
 Illinois's 16th congressional district
 State House District 89
 State Senate District 45

References

External links
 City-Data.com
 Illinois State Archives
 Township Officials of Illinois

Townships in Ogle County, Illinois
Populated places established in 1849
Townships in Illinois
1849 establishments in Illinois